Delhi is a census-designated place (CDP) in Merced County in the U.S. state of California. According to the 2020 census, the population was 10,656.

Geography
It lies northwest across the Merced River from Livingston. Hilmar is to the west, Turlock is to the north, and Ballico is to the east.

Government 
Delhi is the largest unincorporated town in Merced County.  The Delhi Municipal Advisory Council advises the Merced County Board of Supervisors concerning any services which are or may be provided within the boundaries of the Delhi School District by the County or other local governmental agencies.  It has its own unified school district with three K-through-8th schools, (El Capitan Elementary, Schendel Elementary, and Harmony School), one high school, (Delhi Educational Park), and one continuation high school, (Shattuck Educational Park). Delhi's Harmony School opened in 2005. Delhi is in the Turlock Irrigation District, which provides farm water and electrical service.  The Delhi County Water District provides drinking water and sewer service.

State and federal representation

History
The Delhi post office opened in 1912, closed in 1918, and reopened in 1920.

The building housing the New Beginnings Christian Center, a Delhi church, was built for display at the World's Fair in San Francisco, in 1939. The building was to be torn down after the fair, but Enoch Christoffersen, who was a mayor of Turlock, California, said it was too nice of a church so it was bought and the structure was disassembled and shipped by train to Delhi, where it was re-assembled at its current location at 9711 N. Stephens Street.

Demographics

2010
At the 2010 census Delhi had a population of 10,755. The racial makeup of Delhi was 5,655 (52.6%) White, 118 (1.1%) African American, 157 (1.5%) Native American, 405 (3.8%) Asian, 30 (0.3%) Pacific Islander, 3,930 (36.5%) from other races, and 460 (4.3%) from two or more races. Hispanic or Latino of any race were 7,706 persons (71.7%).

The census reported that 10,708 people (99.6% of the population) lived in households, 36 (0.3%) lived in non-institutionalized group quarters, and 11 (0.1%) were institutionalized.

There were 2,680 households, 1,655 (61.8%) had children under the age of 18 living in them, 1,760 (65.7%) were opposite-sex married couples living together, 412 (15.4%) had a female householder with no husband present, 189 (7.1%) had a male householder with no wife present.  There were 169 (6.3%) unmarried opposite-sex partnerships, and 10 (0.4%) same-sex married couples or partnerships. 251 households (9.4%) were one person and 92 (3.4%) had someone living alone who was 65 or older. The average household size was 4.00.  There were 2,361 families (88.1% of households); the average family size was 4.18.

The age distribution was 3,793 people (35.3%) under the age of 18, 1,218 people (11.3%) aged 18 to 24, 3,024 people (28.1%) aged 25 to 44, 2,037 people (18.9%) aged 45 to 64, and 683 people (6.4%) who were 65 or older.  The median age was 27.5 years. For every 100 females, there were 102.3 males.  For every 100 females age 18 and over, there were 100.9 males.

There were 2,854 housing units at an average density of 813.0 per square mile, of the occupied units 1,830 (68.3%) were owner-occupied and 850 (31.7%) were rented. The homeowner vacancy rate was 2.9%; the rental vacancy rate was 3.2%.  7,262 people (67.5% of the population) lived in owner-occupied housing units and 3,446 people (32.0%) lived in rental housing units.

2000
At the 2000 census there were 8,022 people, 2,126 households, and 1,832 families in the CDP. The racial makeup of the CDP was 53.34% White, 1.70% Black or African American, 1.00% Native American, 2.61% Asian, 0.09% Pacific Islander, 34.49% from other races, and 6.78% from two or more races.  55.45% of the population were Hispanic or Latino of any race.
Of the 2,126 households 56.4% had children under the age of 18 living with them, 67.1% were married couples living together, 12.3% had a female householder with no husband present, and 13.8% were non-families. 10.8% of households were one person and 4.4% were one person aged 65 or older.  The average household size was 3.75 and the average family size was 4.00.

The age distribution was 37.0% under the age of 18, 10.3% from 18 to 24, 31.9% from 25 to 44, 14.9% from 45 to 64, and 5.9% 65 or older.  The median age was 27 years. For every 100 females, there were 102.1 males.  For every 100 women age 18 and over, there were 98.6 men.

The median household income was $41,629 and the median family income  was $42,702. Males had a median income of $31,321 versus $19,777 for females. The per capita income for the CDP was $12,960.  About 9.8% of families and 15.1% of the population were below the poverty line, including 15.1% of those under age 18 and 17.9% of those age 65 or over.

References 

 https://web.archive.org/web/20070927200147/http://www.co.merced.ca.us/planning/pdf/delhi/draftcomplan/ch8.pdf (PDF)  Chapter 8.0 of the Delhi Community Plan:  Public Review Draft.  Retrieved March 14, 2007.
http://www.delhi.k12.ca.us  Delhi's school districts website [DUSD]

Census-designated places in Merced County, California
Census-designated places in California